Lee Jason Simeone (born 20 March 1980 in Rochford, Essex, England) is an English musician, who joined the independent record label Le Coq Musique in 2008. Other artists of the label include Kevin Mooney of Adam and the Ants, Gary Asquith of Renegade Soundwave. Simeone left the label in 2012 to set up his own Vernal Equinox Records in London.

Solo career 
Simeone released his debut album The Dream Weaver on the Le Coq Musique label in 2010. The album won rave reviews from Rough Trade Records and Future Music. The album also featured Kevin Mooney of Adam and The Ants on bass for one track titled "Epica".

Productions and collaborations 
Simeone's career as a freelance producer/performer had begun when collaborating with various popular artists in 2010, most notably: the electro-pop pioneer Karel Fialka, Kevin Mooney, Paul Reynolds (ex A Flock Of Seagulls), Gary Asquith of Renegade Soundwave, and Alan Rear (Tony Mansfield, Miguel Bosé).

Mooney, Asquith and Fialka featured on Simeone's 2011 release An Introduction To Simeone. A further collaboration with Fialka was to follow where Simeone guesting on drums and backing vocals for his live shows between 2010 and 2011. Simeone's 2016 offering Best Seat in the Dream EP contains six new tracks and featured guest artists namely; former original Cockney Rebel bandmate Milton-Reame James. Simeone has also appeared in an episode of Ashes to Ashes (TV series) alongside Steve Strange.

In mid 2014, Simeone made a contribution towards production and mastering duties on the Australian rock band Men at Work, Still Life 12 vinyl EP, released the same year via Sony/ATV. He also recorded and performed a song for it titled "Star Lane". It came with a remastered vinyl albumof their 1983 Cargo. Its A-side also featured the original band album recording of "Blue for You", remastered from the original masters at Abbey Road Studios, with mastering engineer Simon Gibson. The EP also featured an interview that Simeone hosted with the original band member Ron Strykert.

In 2015, Simeone became the executive producer for the award winning documentary film You Better Take Cover. A film about Men at Work, their hit single "Down Under", and the "Kookaburra" controversy. You Better Take Cover won best documentary short at the Melbourne International Film Festival (2016) and winning again at the St Kilda Short Film Festival. A further premiere screening at the Manchester International Festival (2016) was met with rave reviews.

Simeone produced the You Better Take Cover soundtrack album at Abbey Road Studios released via PledgeMusic in 2018 as a tribute to Greg Ham. It successfully reached 105% of its funding goal. The album featured collaborations with three original band members of Men at Work. Simeone composed two original songs for the album and produced a cover version of Ham's "Still Life" from the 1985 album, Two Hearts. You Better Take Cover OST also featured band interviews and material that Ham had worked on before his death in 2012. A percentage of the albums sales were donated to Ham's chosen charity; Turning Point Alcohol and Drug Centre.

Charity work
Simeone is a member of Neurofibromatosis Inc. (a nonprofit organisation working towards Neurofibromatosis patient support) and supports the charity by making donations from his releases. He is also involved with supporting The Depression Alliance & Turning Point (charity).

Discography

References

1980 births
Living people
English electronic musicians
English record producers
English multi-instrumentalists
English male singer-songwriters
People from Rochford